Dana–Farber Cancer Institute is a comprehensive cancer treatment and research institution in Boston, Massachusetts. Dana–Farber is the founding member of Dana–Farber/Harvard Cancer Center, Harvard's Comprehensive Cancer Center designated by the National Cancer Institute, and one of the 15 clinical affiliates and research institutes of Harvard Medical School.

As of 2023, Dana–Farber is ranked the #4 cancer hospital in the world. Two Nobel laureates in Physiology or Medicine are among its past and present faculty. Dana–Farber's research discoveries include the development of the highly successful Gleevec to treat chronic myeloid leukemia.

Overview
Dana–Farber employs more than 4,855 full-time and part-time people, 529 faculty, and has annual gross revenues of about $1,733,386,000. All faculty and postdoctoral research fellows at Dana–Farber hold the equivalent academic positions concurrently at Harvard University. There are more than 523,425 adult and pediatric patient visits (combined exam and office visits) a year, and it is involved in more than 1,000 clinical trials. It is internationally known for its research and clinical excellence. Expertscape ranks its programs in aplastic anemia and multiple myeloma as best in the world. It has been also ranked overall the fifth best cancer hospital in the United States by U.S. News & World Report. Dana–Farber is a member of the Multiple Myeloma Research Consortium.

In addition to being a principal teaching affiliate of Harvard Medical School, Dana–Farber is also a federally designated Center for AIDS Research, and a founding member of the Dana–Farber/Harvard Cancer Center (DF/HCC), a federally designated Comprehensive Cancer Center. Providing advanced training in cancer treatment and research for an international faculty, Dana–Farber conducts community-based programs in cancer prevention, detection, and control in New England, and maintains joint programs with other Boston institutions, including St. Elizabeth's Medical Center, Brigham and Women's Hospital, Boston Children's Hospital, and Massachusetts General Hospital.

Dana–Farber is supported by the National Cancer Institute, the National Institute of Allergy and Infectious Diseases, and private foundations and individuals contributions. The Jimmy Fund is the principal charity of the Institute named for one of its child patients. The Boston Red Sox adopted the Jimmy Fund as its official charity in 1953 and continues to prominently sponsor the charity.

Laurie Glimcher is President/CEO of Dana–Farber Cancer Institute/Jimmy Fund. In 2015, Forbes listed the charity as the 37th biggest in the U.S.

History
 1947: Sidney Farber, MD, founded the Children's Cancer Research Foundation.
 1969: The Institute officially expanded its programs to include patients of all ages.
 1974: It became known as the Sidney Farber Cancer Institute in honor of its founder.
 1983: The support of the Charles A. Dana Foundation was acknowledged by incorporating Dana's name.

In August 2018, Dana–Farber Cancer Institute launched a Chinese language section to the hospital website. The new pages are intended to reach Chinese-speaking people both in the United States and abroad who are seeking cancer-related information. The hospital also has a Spanish language site.

In February 2020, Dana–Farber Cancer Institute inked an investing collaboration deal with MPM Capital. The deal combines MPM's venture capital investment fundraising with Dana–Farber's fundraising for cancer research.

Breakthroughs
Dana–Farber has a long history of breakthrough discoveries in cancer care and research.
 1947: Sidney Farber leads a team of researchers who are the first in the world to attain temporary remissions of acute lymphocytic leukemia, the most common cancer in children, using aminopterin. This, and another antifolate drug, methotrexate used by Dr. Farber, were discovered and supplied by Dr. Yellapragada Subbarow, Director, Research at Lederle Co. at Pearl River, NY.
 1954: Farber and his colleagues achieve the first remissions of Wilms' tumor, a common form of childhood cancer, and boost cure rates from 40 percent to 85 percent.
 1976: Researchers at the Sidney Farber Cancer Center (now Dana–Farber) develop a new treatment for acute myelogenous leukemia that produces the first complete remissions of the disease in up to half of all patients.
 1978: Institute investigators develop combination chemotherapy for soft-tissue sarcomas resulting in a 50-percent response rate.
 1980: Dana–Farber president Baruj Benacerraf receives the Nobel Prize in Physiology or Medicine for the discovery of the major histocompatibility complex, which enables the immune system to recognize antigens.
 1982: Dana–Farber researchers develop and apply the CA-125 blood test for ovarian cancer. They also are among the first to suspect a relationship between the retrovirus that causes human T-cell leukemia (HTLV-1) and that which causes AIDS (HIV-1).
 1991: Dana–Farber investigators help introduce the use of naturally occurring growth hormones following high-dose chemotherapy, making bone marrow transplantation safer and more effective.
 1993: Dana–Farber investigators discover the gene that increases the risk for a common type of colon cancer. The MSH2 gene and later the MLH1 gene (also by DFCI investigators) are linked to hereditary nonpolyposis colorectal cancer (HNPCC).
 1996: Institute researchers dramatically advance the understanding of how HIV, the virus that causes AIDS, replicates and infects healthy cells. Science magazine heralds this discovery as its "Breakthrough of the Year".
 1998: A drug called imatinib (Gleevec), the early work for which was done at Dana–Farber, achieves striking success in many patients with chronic myelogenous leukemia.
 1999: Working with colleagues at other hospitals, Dana–Farber scientists begin the first human studies of endostatin, one of a new generation of compounds that arrest or shrink tumors by shutting off their blood supply.
 2002: Dana–Farber researchers find that Gleevec, a targeted therapy that achieved striking success against chronic myelogenous leukemia, can shrink and even eliminate tumors in some patients with a rare and otherwise incurable digestive-tract cancer called gastrointestinal stromal tumor.
 2003: Scientists at Dana–Farber and the Whitehead Institute find a gene "signature" in several types of tumors that suggests they are likely to spread to other parts of the body, potentially leading to tests for determining whether tumors have the potential to metastasize.
 2005: Dana–Farber scientists report that the drug gefitinib (Iressa) produces dramatic benefits in non-small cell lung cancer patients who carry an abnormal version of a key protein, a potentially life-saving discovery for tens of thousands of patients around the world every year.
 2019: Dana–Farber physician and researcher William Kaelin Jr. receives the Nobel Prize in Physiology or Medicine for "discoveries of how cells sense and adapt to oxygen availability."

Patient care
Dana–Farber/St. Elizabeth's Cancer Center (DF/SEMC) and Dana–Farber/Brigham and Women's Cancer Center (DF/BWCC) are collaborations between Dana–Farber Cancer Institute, St. Elizabeth's Medical Center, and Brigham and Women's Hospital to care for adults with cancer. Dana–Farber provides outpatient services, while inpatient care is provided by St. Elizabeth's Medical Center and Brigham and Women's Hospital. DF/SEMC and DF/BWCC care for adult patients in more than a dozen specialized treatment centers.

Dana–Farber/Boston Children's Cancer and Blood Disorders Center is a more than 70-year-old partnership between Boston Children's Hospital and Dana–Farber Cancer Institute that delivers comprehensive care to children with and survivors of all types of childhood cancers.

They also work with several other local New England organizations that share a similar vision, such as Take a Swing at Cancer, Angel's Hope, Childhood Cancer Lifeline of New Hampshire and Andrew's Helpful Hands.

Dana–Farber/Harvard Cancer Center
The Dana–Farber/Harvard Cancer Center is the largest National Cancer Institute (NCI) designated Comprehensive Cancer Center in the nation. Founded in 1997, DF/HCC is an inter-institutional research enterprise that unites all of the cancer research efforts of the Harvard affiliated community. The primary goal of the Cancer Center is to encourage and promote collaborative interactions and translational research that will lead to new approaches to cancer prevention, diagnosis, and treatment.

DF/HCC is one of just 39 NCI designated Comprehensive Cancer Centers. Its members hail from the following institutions: Beth Israel Deaconess Medical Center, Brigham and Women’s Hospital, Boston Children's Hospital, Dana–Farber Cancer Institute, Harvard Medical School, Harvard School of Public Health, Massachusetts General Hospital, and St. Elizabeth's Medical Center.

References

Hospital buildings completed in 1947
Teaching hospitals in Massachusetts
Hospitals in Boston
Harvard Medical School
Medical research institutes in Massachusetts
Cancer organizations based in the United States
NCI-designated cancer centers
Hospitals established in 1947